The 2008 UCF Knights football team represented the University of Central Florida in the 2008 NCAA Division I FBS football season.  Their head coach was George O'Leary, in his fifth season with the team.  For the second season, the UCF Knights played all of their home games at Bright House Networks Stadium on the school's main campus in Orlando, Florida. The Knights sought unsuccessfully to defend their Conference USA football championship.

Personnel

Recruiting class

Coach O'Leary and his coaching staff announced these people to the 2008 UCF Knights Football Team on Wednesday February 6, 2008; as it was the National Football Signing Day:-- --- -- --- -- --- -- --- -- --- --

AthleteMarquee Williams (Vanguard – Ocala, Florida)

Defensive BacksChad Keys (St. Paul's School – Covington, Louisiana)

Defensive EndsJarvis Gathers (Feather River C.C. – Andrews, South Carolina)Robert Pritchard (North Gwinnett – Suwanee, Georgia)

Defensive TackleTheo Goins (Hightower – Fort Bend, Texas)Chris Martin (Choctawhatchee – Fort Walton Beach, Florida)

LinebackersJosh Linam (Tavares – Tavares, Florida)Loren Robinson (Lyman – Longwood, Florida)David Williams (Cardinal Gibbons – Ft. Lauderdale)

Offensive LinemanChad Hounshell (Lake Catholic – Mentor, Ohio)Jarien Moreland (Glade Central Community – Belle Glade, Florida)John Oliver (Troup – LaGrange, Georgia)Steven Robinson (Lincoln – Tallahassee, Florida)

Running BacksBrandon Davis (Peachtree Ridge – Suwanee, Georgia)Brynn Harvey (Largo – Largo, Florida)Vance King (Stockbridge – Stockbridge, Georgia)Latavius Murray (Onondaga Central – Nedrow, New York)

Tight Ends / Hybrid BackBrendan Kelly (Shoreham-Wading River – Shoreham, New York)Kyle Madden (Harrison – Kennesaw, Georgia)

QuarterbackRob Calabrese (East Islip – Islip Terrace, New York)

Offseason
On August 22, 2008, wide receiver Richard Jackson announced that he had completed his enrollment at UCF, completing a transfer from the University of Notre Dame.  Jackson was a star prospect from East Ridge High School in nearby Clermont, Florida.  He received a hardship waiver from the NCAA on September 5, giving him immediate eligibility.

Schedule

Game summaries

South Carolina State

The Knights began their season at home against South Carolina State.  Making his first start at quarterback, Michael Greco had a difficult time trying to find his groove, completing 9-of-16 passing for 90 yards, and running 13 times for 57 yards.  But the defense remained strong and carried the team, holding the Bulldog offense to less than 22 minutes of play time, with Jason Venson catching an interception.

South Florida

Greco's struggles continued when the Knights hosted South Florida for the last match in their "War on I-4" rivalry.  While the Bulls scored first, Joe Burnett answered back with a 91-yard kickoff return for a touchdown.  The Knights defense held as well as they could, holding the Bulls to 10 points in the first half and allowing the Knights to tie the game going into halftime.  However, the Knights had difficulty maintaining their discipline, and it cost them in penalties.  The Knights had 12 penalties for 148 yards, one of which negated a touchdown on an interception in the second quarter.

Although it appeared the Bulls would begin to run away with the game, scoring two touchdowns in the third quarter, Michael Greco finally awoke toward the end of the fourth quarter, leading two touchdown drives in the final minutes of regulation to force overtime.  However, they came up short on a fourth-down run on their turn, failing to answer a quick South Florida touchdown.

Although sluggish for most of the game, the Knights offense did not turn the ball over.  After their first two games, UCF has a +3 turnover ratio.

The unanticipated struggles for the Bulls dropped them back to their preseason #19 ranking in the AP poll despite the win.

Boston College

UTEP

SMU

Miami (FL)

Tulsa

East Carolina

Southern Miss

Marshall

Memphis

UAB

References

UCF
UCF Knights football seasons
UCF Knights football